Atractus sanctaemartae,  St. Marta's ground snake, is a species of snake in the family Colubridae. The species can be found in Colombia.

References 

Atractus
Endemic fauna of Colombia
Reptiles of Colombia
Snakes of South America
Reptiles described in 1946
Taxa named by Emmett Reid Dunn